This is a list of significant characters from the animated television series, Mysticons—created by Sean Jara—including any relevant media adaptations and spin-offs explicitly stated to take place within its narrative universe.

Creation and conception
The Mysticons are four teenage girls whose destiny it is to use unique mystical powers and weaponry to defend the world of Gemina and its inhabitants from evil forces, namely the Spectral Hand. A generation of Mysticons is chosen once every thousand years by the ancient and powerful Dragon Disk. Their unique Mysticon abilities and weaponry become a hundred times greater and more effective when the Codex is combined into one larger spellbook, which happened to have been drained dry of its magic by Queen Necrafa herself. The second generation of legendary Mysticons are Princess Arkayna Goodfey, Zarya Moonwolf, Piper Willowbrook, and Emerald Zirconia Goldenbraid. The Vexicons are four, dark female warriors called from the pages of Proxima's Dark Codex. They debut as shadowed cameos at the end of "Happily Never After", but make their full debut in "The Lost Scepter" where they race the Mysticons to find an ancient and immensely powerful mind-controlling scepter that belonged to one of Gemina's centuries-old child king. They are considered the dark counterparts of the Mysticons. They each have their own dark animal bracer to combat those of light wielded by the Mysticons- blue Snake, orange Panther, purple Bat and pink Basilisk.

In a last ditch effort to annihilate the Spectral Hand once and for all, the Mysticons had received four grown Dragons of Light after the dragon eggs went through the portal to the Ever Realm, where time flows faster. Each dragon is colored by each Mysticon's signature color: Princess Arkayna's dragon mount is a light green, Zarya's a pale blue, Piper's a light orange, and Emerald's light purple. Now astride these majestic and powerful creatures, the Mysticons had succeeded in firing their magnified bracers at the Spectral Hand, destroying it in one single strike. There's also the Astromancers, an ancient league of mages (sorcerers and sorceresses) who have protected Gemina. They reside at the Astromancer Academy. Those of the top level have a deep purple magical aura while mid-level Astromancers have a light orange magical aura.

The Pink Skulls are a group of sky pirates who plunder and pillage whatever they find, and were founded several years prior when Zarya was a young orphan girl in Drake City. Then there's the legendary Mer-Knights of the Silver Trident of myth, fierce and brave mermaid/mermen warriors who possess the ancient and very powerful Silver Tridents. According to Emerald, children's tales of them have been famous for many, many years. Apart from this, millennium ago, the ancient and mighty Dragons of Light had fought a fiercely violent final battle in their sacred homeland of Dragonhenge. Unfortunately, thousands had fallen and were thought to be extinct at the hand of one of the Spectral Dragons. Until a dragon egg was discovered by the second generation of Mysticons, which hatched an infant storm dragon whom Princess Arkayna decided to christen "Stormy" due to her weather-controlling abilities.

Also, four of the dozens of baby dragons that had resided in the yellow eggs, hidden secretly in a cave in Dragonhenge and had escaped total death and annihilation by the original Spectral Dragon. After going through the swirling portal to the Ever Realm, the four returned as adult full-fledged Dragons of Light instantaneously. Each one is colored in the Mysticons' signature color: Light green for Princess Arkayna, light blue for Zarya, pale orange for Piper, and pale purple for Emerald. They seem to have replaced the everlasting faithful griffin mounts- Izzie, Archer, Miss Paisley and Topaz- as the Mysticons are seen on the dragons backs in the last scene of the show.

Principal characters
 Princess Arkayna Goodfey  (voiced by Alyson Court) – The eldest Princess Twin of Gemina and second Mysticon Dragon Mage, who is the fearless leader of the Mysticons. Her signature color is dark green and her symbol of mystical power is the dragon form the bright green Dragon Bracer. 

Her Mysticon weapon is a staff that emits powerful green fire and can erect a protective shield. Her griffin companion is named Izzie. She initially disliked learning of the original four Mysticons from her mother, the Queen. She demonstrated telekinetic skill by mentally levitating a construction and converting it into a ramp; her eyes glow white while utilizing this ability. She eventually learns that she has a fraternal twin sister who was believed to be Astromancer Proxima Starfall, one of the top Astromancers' strongest star mages. Later it is revealed that the sarcastic Zarya is her true twin sister, though they both seemed to welcome Proxima into "the sisterhood" as their honorary twin. Her romantic interest is the talented mid-level Astromancer, Malvaron Grimm. She grew up playing with the royal griffins and relies on her honor, determination and ideals to always do the right thing. However, she is mostly oblivious to the feelings of others; namely Proxima's deeply hurt feelings of betrayal and greater sense of loneliness and desertion towards her for never actually being there for her after learning that Zarya was her real twin sister. As Mysticon Dragon Mage, she can emit and control green fire, create objects like curtains and a bush for camouflage out of thin air, and erect a green force-field from her Dragon Mage staff. 
 Zarya Moonwolf (voiced by Nicki Burke) – Chosen as the second Mysticon Ranger, she is thought to be an "orphaned pauper" who does her best to help other poor kids on the street, often acting as a big sister to them and Piper. She is wily and tough with a roguish charm. Her signature color is dark blue and her symbol of mystical power is the wolf. Her weapon is a shortbow from which she fires an array of mystical arrows. She is known as "the muscle" of the group. She first named her griffin "Stinky" because of his breath, but later renamed him "Archer". She is expelled from the team in "Scourge of the Seven Skies" and heads off alone. Her bracer and large blue book of Codex spells falls into the possession of Dreadbane who corrupts her bright blue Wolf Bracer. She eventually succeeds in getting them back. 
She temporarily replaces Arkayna as leader but refuses to take the position permanently. It is revealed that she had been the lost youngest twin princess and Arkayna's fraternal twin sister, having been left at Hortensia Sparklebottom's fairy orphanage for the first three years of her life, the very same place where Proxima was left at also as a newborn fifteen years previously. Series creator Sean Jara confirmed that she is in a relationship with her best childhood friend the captain of the pink skulls, Kitty Boon, a relationship supported by the show's director, Matt Ferguson. Her special abilities as Mysticon Ranger are never revealed as there are not enough episodes. 
 Piper Willowbrook (voiced by Ana Sani) – An elf orphan who, along with Zarya, works to help fellow poor people in Drake City. She is Mysticon Striker. She is optimistic, energetic and fun-loving. Her signature colors are shades of yellow and blue and her symbol of mystical power is the phoenix. Her weapons are three yellow chakrams that act as boomerangs strong to render enemies unconscious from a distance. In addition, she can create sparkly yellow orbs, which she calls her "pixie blast" attack, and is the only power shown by Mysticon Striker, as there is not enough episodes. Her griffin companion is named Miss Paisley, after a lost stuffed toy. She is known as "the party bringer" of the team. It is revealed that her name was given to her by Zarya when they first met as preteens. Her full birth name is Pyperia Ashryn Elvanestri. Despite her youthful looks, she is revealed to be 110, as elves possess longevity and decelerated aging. She loves music and acrobatics and is a natural performer.
 Emerald Zirconia Goldenbraid (voiced by Evany Rosen) – A teenage dwarf who originally worked as the royal family's griffin wrangler and is the second Mysticon Knight. Called "Em" for short, she is smart, empathetic, innovative, and can engineer just about anything. Her signature color is purple and, at times, pink; her symbol of mystical power is the pink unicorn, which is the same color as the dark Basilisk Bracer belonging to her "dark" Vexicon counterpart Eartha. 

She can erect a pink orbicular shield around her and her fellow Mysticons. Her griffin companion is named Topaz. She is known to be "the heart" of the team. In addition to her mystic sword, she can use her dwarven gadgets to disable machinery from a distance or to seek out her fellow Mysticons if separated. She is given a legendary Silver Trident by Queen Truefin, as a gift for her bravery. Her boyfriend is the hunky Kasey Boon of the Pink Skulls. Her special abilities as Mysticon Knight are never revealed, as they are not enough episodes, though her pink energy shield is considered one.

Supporting characters

Kitty Boon (voiced by Katie Griffin) – Captain of the Pink Skulls, female pirate, and Zarya's childhood friend. She takes advantage of this relationship to incapacitate the Mysticons and obtain the Dragon Disk, which she sells to Dreadbane (she later deeply regret about her action). She later fights alongside the Mysticons, and on a third occasion gives Zarya inspiration to thwart Necrafa's plans. She is later revealed to be Zarya's romantic love interest, as confirmed by the show's creator, Sean Jara, who said they treated their relationship "like all the other relationships in the show," with Matt Ferguson, the show's director, supporting the addition of the relationship. In the comic books, she debuts in Volume 2.
Kasey Boon (voiced by Joshua Graham) – Kitty's younger brother who Emerald developed a crush on. He gave her a bracelet which was revealed to be a tracking device to follow the Mysticons. He later appears to have second thoughts about taking advantage of Em's feelings for him, and catches her, after which the two have a serious romance. In the comics, he debuts in Volume 2.
 Nova Terron (voiced by Dan Lett) – Holding the top rank of Star Master, he is a stern and bearded leader with a high-pitched voice. He sees the new Mysticons as failures whose incompetence will bring about the apocalypse, especially when they defy his order to destroy the complete Codex. This resulting Nova decided eliminated them if they defying him. However, after learnings Mysticon's real identity, he finally realized what he has done. Meaning he never trusting them in the first place. He finally confess to Arkayna that he had been ordered by his master, Alpha Galiga, to separate the twin princesses, Arkayna and Zarya, as newborns. He came to enjoy playing the video game Avatars of the Apocalypse.
 Tazma Grimm (voiced by Michelle Monteith) – Malvaron's older sister who favors training over natural talent and is chosen to train the Mysticons. She later betrays them and the Astromancers to obtain power for herself. She was the Shadow Mage who had forced Zarya and Piper to steal the Dragon Disk in exchange for Choko in the first episode. She later seems to have second thoughts about Dreadbane's leadership, calling him weak and incompetent. Tazma partners with Kymraw to claim the complete Codex from the Mysticons but is betrayed; she is horrified when Dreadbane uses it to release Queen Necrafa. She informs Necrafa of the new Mysticons and joins her for vengeance. Tazma is saved from being destroyed with the lair of the Spectral Hand and imprisoned in a snow-globe for her crimes. She was eventually freed by her reluctant younger brother and took the chance to escape by teleporting away in a flash of shadowy smoke. She remains at large in the realm after the defeat of the Spectral Hand.
Proxima Starfall (voiced by Stacey DePass) – A short orphan with red glasses, a black bob-cut hairstyle, and pale tan skin. Her innate magical strength is exceptional and she has more experience in high-star technology than most top-level Astromancers. She offers to use her magic to locate the Mysticons per Nova Terron's orders. She later demands that they be "brought to justice" in retaliation for Emerald giving her a star-shaped scar on her right cheek. She had always felt like she was missing an essential part of herself, which seems to be explained when she was believed to be the lost princess of Gemina and Arkayna's fraternal twin. However, she was merely a decoy to protect the real twin princess, Zarya. To gain revenge on the Mysticons for making her believe that she was loved and wanted in the realm, she secretly kept the sinister fragment of Queen Necrafa's evil mask, allowing its dark power to consume her soul. She then corrupts the Dragon Disk, and creates her very own Dark Codex, from which she calls forth the Vexicons. 

While the Vexicons distract the Mysticons, Proxima continues her plot to achieve her bitter vengeance on the oblivious Princess Arkayna for not being there for her and choosing to abandon her, ever since she discovered that Zarya was her true twin sister. She eventually came to regret allowing the dark power within the mask fragment to consume her and intended to toss it back into the Rift of Ruin. Unfortunately for her, it has long since been attached to her intensely bitter feelings of loneliness, hatred and betrayal and has now taken full control of her troubled spirit and body in full measure. Her tormented mind is later intruded by the Mysticons, with the help of Tazma, in an attempt to break the stronger hold Necrafa's mask now has upon her by finding the "Free Psyche" spell. She makes amends by revealing what she has learned about the Spectral Hand itself, and reverses the dark spell she cast on the Astromancers. In the end, she is given the untainted but powerless Dragon Disk and still-powerless Codex by Nova Terron, who resigns as leader of the Astromancers to stay with his longtime starmate Geraldine by going off on inter-dimensional adventures with her, and gives the topmost position of "Star Mistress" to the teenage orphan, which moved her. She is still considered as Princess Arkayna's sister. Her origins may finally be explored in the upcoming movie.
 Malvaron Grimm (voiced by Deven Christian Mack) – A young, talented male mid-level Astromancer who is stationed in the palace. He becomes the Mysticons' new instructor in mystical abilities. He has romantic feelings for Arkayna, which are expressed somewhat when he admitted that he was scared that he might lose her. Unlike top-level Astromancers, his exceptionally powerful innate magical aura is colored light orange; the same as his aunt Geraldine Yaga. He is the love interest and starmate of Princess Arkayna.
 Douglaphius "Doug" Hadderstorm (voiced by Doug Hadders) – A large cyclops Astromancer and friend of Malvaron. He becomes Malvaron's assistant in training the new Mysticons. He has an obsession with a tiny child's collectible called "Twinkly Mare" and "Twinkly Dragon". Even though he is in the Order of the Astromancers, he seems to possess no magical abilities whatsoever, which he himself officially confirms in The Secret of the Fifth Mysticon chapter book of not having any "flashy powers." He goes by "Doug" for short.
 Queen Necrafa (voiced by Valerie Buhagiar) – Leader and witch queen of the sinister Spectral Hand who was defeated by the original Mysticons a thousand years ago. Dreadbane intends to resurrect her with the Dragon Disk, though it is later implied she is imprisoned in another dimension that Dreadbane intends to breach. Once she is released, she double-crosses her devoted general by hurling him into the dark world where she was trapped. She similarly uses the Codex, draining its magic to rejuvenate herself and amplify her power, before hurling it through the gateway. Necrafa doubts Tazma's word that there are new Mysticons, and regards them as mere children when she confronts them in Drake City. Necrafa joins with the Spectral Dragon but is destroyed by Arkayna and Zarya who bonded together and turned into twin dragons. However, a fragment of the skeletal mask she wore is left behind. It is revealed that she was originally a powerful elf, highly gifted in ancient elf magics, whose entire being was fully consumed by the mask of the Spectral Hand, turning her into undead lich-queen of pure evilness. This implies that she is/was distantly related to Piper.
 General Reginald Bane "Dreadbane" (voiced by Deven Christian Mack) – The undead leader of the skeleton army who loves Necrafa and seeks to steal the Dragon Disk to resurrect her. He eventually succeeds but she rejects his feelings and hurls him into her former prison, an inter-dimensional world of darkness. He is discovered there by Tazma and the Mysticons who came searching for the Codex. Having lost his memory he calls himself "Reginald" and had built a flower garden as an expression of his unrequited love. In a bizarre turn of events, he attacks Tazma, warning that Necrafa will betray her. He later uses Zarya's mystical bowstring to return to his lair. He takes the yellow mystic rings to give to Necrafa, but comes to see that she used him; He throws the rings down and he leaves. He returns in "Fear the Spectral Hand" in which he was revealed to have a mighty Sky Lancer who defended the realm bravely until he was tainted by the evil forces of the Spectral Hand; thus becoming the undead skeleton Dreadbane. In an act of self-sacrifice, he reverses the spell of petrification on the King and Queen and makes Princess Arkayna promise to defend the city he loves before expiring into the stars.
 Serena Snakecharmer (voiced by Julie Lemieux) – A gorgon reporter who has wiggly blonde hair of live snakes, one of which is named Serena. She dons sunglasses during her big reports. She reported live on the coronation of Gwayne "the Great", and got a closer look at Arkayna gate-crashing the party as the Dragon Mage. Her last appearance was in "The Foz Who Saved Lotus Night" when she was turned full zombie.
Kymraw (voiced by Linda Kash) – A gruff female troll who leads a biker gang and speaks in the third person. She aided in the abduction of recently crowned King Gwayne. She swore vengeance on the Mysticons, and attempts to take it on later occasions. She gave Dreadbane information on the Codex when she overheard Piper's boasting. She betrays Tazma and hands over the completed Codex to Dreadbane for two gold-filled treasure chests, stating that "double-cross means double pay." She is eventually hypnotized by Tazma into doing her bidding as payment for this double-cross.
Imani Firewing (voiced by Athena Karkanis)- One thousand years ago, she was chosen as the first Dragon Mage and leader of the original Mysticons, who had perished defending the realm of Gemina from Queen Necrafa. First appearing in a flashback in "The Astromancer Job", she was the last of her generation of Mysticons standing against Dreadbane in the wasteland of Victory Heights; she defeated Necrafa by unleashing the powers of her mystical "Bracer of the Heavens", imprisoning Necrafa in a far-off world, but this caused Imani to lose her own life. A statue of her is in the royal treasury and on the Hill of Heroes alongside her fellow Mysticons. In "The Secret of the Fifth Mysticon" novel, it is revealed that she was deeply afraid of foz.
Quasarla (voiced by Athena Karkanis)- A female Astromancer who had fought alongside the original Mysticons during their battle against Queen Necrafa. She was eventually overpowered and turned into a mindless, masked Spectromancer by her fellow Astromancer colleague Proxima.

Other characters

Minor villains
Mallory (voiced by Amy Matysio)-- The leader of the Vexicons and Princess Arkayna's evil counterpart. She has light blue skin, ice-white spiked hair and a blue staff with a jagged dark blue crystal which emits strong beams of icy, snowy energy. She also has an animal sidekick named Deeva, a pale aqua blue fox-like creature (Choko's evil counterpart) that she wears around her neck like a muffler. Her bracer is a serpent/snake, which she attacks with by calling out "Ice Serpent, Strike!"; the same color as Zarya's blue Wolf Bracer. She is the most rebellious of all four Vexicons, even attempting to overthrow her own creator and "mother" by attaining the Mask for herself. She succeeds but is fully influenced by it after she manages to get it back from her star mistress. She is later imprisoned with her sisters Kasha and Willa, and Deeva, in the royal dungeon. 
Kasha (voiced by Bahia Watson)- An orange cat-humanoid and Zarya's evil counterpart. She can emit three blasts of red energy from her claws. She also has skates that enable her to levitate in midair at high speeds. Her animal bracer is a bright orange panther, from which her attack phrase is "Shadow Panther, Pounce." Ironically, she makes cat puns.
Eartha (voiced by Alana Bridgewater)- Large and muscular, and is Em's evil counterpart.  Her body is made of solid stone and she can turn into a huge boulder-like ball of rock to carry the other three inside. Her animal bracer is pink basilisk, from which she calls out "Basilisk, Stampede!" as her attack phrase; same pink color as Emerald's Unicorn bracer. Her weapon is a large hammer, from which she can project a strong blast of pink energy. Out of all four Vexicons, she is the most polite and somewhat kinder. She ultimately defies her three sisters and now lives with Emerald at her hometown.
Willa (voiced by Stephany Seki)- An imp with small, purple bat wings, and is Piper's evil counterpart. She has purple skin and can fire purple beams of energy from her hands. She can also teleport over short or long distances in a flash of purple smoke, namely by stating the phrase "Quicker than a flicker." Her purple animal bracer is a bat; her attack phrase is "Fear the Nightmare". Her additional special ability is "Boom Doom" similar to Piper's "Pixie Blast" attack. She is ultimately imprisoned with Mallory, Kasha and Deeva.
Captain Kaos (voiced by Jamie Waston) – A large parrot-like creature who is captain of a pirate crew; he had attacked the village where Zarya and Kitty lived as young children. In retaliation for later marooning him on a desert island, he returns and abducts Kasey to lure Zarya and Kitty into a trap. He hypnotizes them into following him to the island's ancient ruins (that is ultimately revealed to be the Spectral Hand itself), where a malevolent force seeks to devour their souls. However, Zarya utilizes her Wolf Bracer to push him down into the ruins which devours his entire being. It is later revealed that he was one of many who was manipulated by the Spectral Hand.
 Skeleton/Spectral Army – Hundreds of undead skeletons who work for Queen Necrafa and Dreadbane. Once Necrafa is released, she uses her magnified powers to give them "a makeover" by turning them into hooded spectral-like creatures. They were ultimately destroyed by the Princess Twin Dragons in one single strike.
 Spectromancers – As of "Happily Never After", dozens of top-level Astromancers (including Nova Terron, Gandobi, and Quasarla) were all quickly overpowered by Proxima and turned into her masked, mindless minions. Proxima proclaimed herself the new leader and Queen of the Spectral Hand; her very first command was for them to kneel before her as she corrupted the Dragon Disk. She then had them utilize the ancient starfire ink she had stolen for her to effectively create her very own Dark Codex. After Proxima was released from the mask's darker hold, she reversed the spell which turned them back into Astromancers.

Family and friends of protagonists
 Queen Goodfey (voiced by Linda Kash) – Princess Arkayna's mother, Zarya Moonwolf's birth mother (originally believed to be Proxima Starfall's biological mother), King Consort Darius' second wife, Gawayne's stepmother, and Queen of Gemina. Alongside her second husband and king consort, she oversees the training of her daughter, stepson and dwarf subject Emerald Goldenbraid on their griffin companions. She is turned to solid stone by Dreadbane's evil magic, and her absence prompted her arrogant and selfish stepson Gawayne to declare himself monarch in her place. She is temporarily revived, astonished at her daughter as the Dragon Mage, and assures Arkayna to be confident before reverting to stone. Her stone body falls into the depths of the sea and is given to a kraken as tribute by Queen Truefin; the Mysticons explain the situation and lift Goodfey's statue to the surface. It is later revealed that Goodfey has another daughter with purple hair and green eyes who grew up to be known as Zarya Moonwolf. She is finally fully restored to living flesh and blood at the end of "Fear the Spectral Hand" by Dreadbane himself. She is introduced to Zarya, having regained the brief memories of her youngest twin daughter by Nova Terron, and reluctantly gives her daughters and their fellow Mysticons the plans to greatly strengthening their animal bracers temporarily. Like her second husband and stepson, she will make many more appearances in the Mysticons comics and as a supporting character with more speaking roles. Her relationship with her late first husband, the old King Goodfey and biological father to the fraternal Princess Twins of Gemina, may also be revealed via flashbacks or pictures.
 King Darius (voiced by Patrick McKenna) – Queen Goodfey's second husband and king consort, Gawayne's father, and stepfather to the princess twins Arkayna and Zarya. He is turned to solid stone by Dreadbane in the very first episode. He is almost restored to living flesh by the combined mystical power of his stepdaughter and Malvaron, but ends up falling into the depths of the sea, where the Mer-Knights used him as tribute to a kraken. He was later brought to the surface and put in the palace throne room alongside his petrified wife. His bone form is finally revived at the end of Episode Thirty-Nine. He is to make appearances as a supporting character in the comics and chapter books. In actuality, there were several ancient kings during the B.C. eras the same name.
 Acting King Gawayne (voiced by David Berni) – Princess Arkayna and Zarya's selfish, spoiled and overweight stepbrother and the source of their many frustrations. After his father and stepmother were turned to bone statues, he is crowned Acting King of Gemina (dubbing himself "Gawayne the Great"), but was abducted and used to extort the Mysticons into handing over the Dragon Disk. In another episode, he chooses his own safety over his people. At one point he obtains the orange and blue gems of Queen Necrafa. He gives the blue one to his pixie girlfriend, Lateensia, who dumps him afterward because of his selfishness, leaving him crushed. He tearfully attempts to persuade her to take him back, claiming that he will try to change. He writes letters to the bone statue of his father in secret, admitting that he would trade being king to have him back. At the Sky Lancers' Festival, e is surprised and not amused upon learning that his twin stepsisters were, in fact, Mysticon Dragon Mage and Mysticon Ranger all along.
Citrine Goldenbraid (voiced by Denise Oliver) – Emerald's optimistic and overexcited mother who lives in a cottage in the town of Rudix Hollow. One of her family recipes is a soup that Zarya pretends to dislike. She gives Princess Arkayna a hope ring that will give her strength in fulfilling her quest to stop Dreadbane. She believes that Emerald works in the castle as a griffin wrangler. She later pays her daughter a surprise visit for some quality mother-daughter time, and learns the truth about Em's Mysticon identity. She makes her Season Three appearances in "Total Eclipse of the Golden Heart," "Heart of Stone", "Fear the Spectral Hand" and "Age of Dragons". In Volume 2 of the ongoing comic book series, he is twice referenced by his teenage daughter.
Malachite Goldenbraid (voiced by Neil Crone) – Emerald's grumpy and cold father with whom she was very close as a child, calling her "Poo Twinkle" much to her chagrin. He is a dwarf engineer with a workshop in the cottage basement. He disapproved of his daughter's working at the castle, but admits that he had always been proud of her. He is the only one who knows of her identity as the second Mysticon Knight. He returns in "Heart of Stone" and "Age of Dragons." In the graphic novels and original chapter books, she will appear as a supporting character. In Volume 2 of the comic book series, he is twice referenced by his daughter.
Halite and Ferrus Goldenbraid (voiced by Rob Tinkler for Halite and Deven Christian Mack for Ferrus) – Emerald's younger fraternal twin brothers who enjoy goofing off and embarrassing their older sister. They both have a crush on Piper and her cheery quirks. Halite has inherited his mother's hair while Ferrus has his father's hair color. They make their second appearance in Episode 35 "Heart of Stone."
 Neeko (voiced by Cory Doran) – A homeless orphan with short pink hair. He is given a bag of food that Zarya and Piper stole. Zarya always tells him to "keep the magic real", implying that he may possess inherent magical abilities. He is surprised to learn that Zarya was a Mysticon the whole time in "Game of Phones."
Barnabas Dinklelot (voiced by Paul Soles) – A troll who is a security guard at the mall where the second Codex spellbook was found by Piper. He also likes Twinkly Mare and gave one to Doug as a token of their adventure together. He later shows holographic stories of the leader of the original Mysticons, Imani Firewing, and her final battle against Necrafa. In Season 2, he narrates the heroic tale "The Foz Who Saved Lotus Night" to several foz.
Princess Kelpie Truefin (voiced by Talia Pearl) – A young and tough mermaid warrior and preteen daughter of Queen Truefin who crosses paths with the Mysticons during their search of the ocean depths, for the bone statues of Princess Arkayna's mother and stepfather. Distrusting them, she zaps Zarya and Princess Arkayna with her legendary silver trident and accuses them of trespassing. She makes a second appearance in "The Mask" along with her mother, a flashback of Proxima's in "Eternal Starshine of the Mage's Mind," and a final cameo appearance in "Age of Dragons."
Queen Truefin (voiced by Denise Oliver) – Queen of the mythical Mer-Knights of the Silver Trident, who had the bone statues of Queen Goodfey and Darius in her possession, with the intent of sacrificing them to a vicious kraken to ensure her people's safety. She initially mistrusts the Mysticons, but works alongside them to stop the kraken. She apologizes for her actions by giving Emerald one of the legendary Silver Tridents as a reward for the second Mysticon Knight's bravery in saving her young daughter. There were not enough episodes to reveal her first name nor her relationship with her deceased husband or any of her people. 
King Valmuk (voiced by Cedric Smith) – The king of Dragonhenge and the majestic, mighty ruler of the Dragons of Light. He had mysteriously disappeared, never to be seen or heard from again for the next thousand years. His renowned wife and queen Auratha had tragically perished alongside most of their fellow dragons. It is revealed that he had been living among the citizens of the modern world as a panhandler called "Snor-y Dude" by the Mysticons, due him always snoring and begging for a gold coin. In "The Edge of Two Morrows", it was he who had sent Piper into an alternate reality, so she could learn to embrace her destiny as a Mysticon. He revealed his true form to the Mysticons, in "The Last Dragon" so he could take Stormy home and unite her with their family who have been hidden in a secret location at Dragonhenge, a cavern full of dragon eggs. He makes a second and final appearance in "Age of Dragons", as the Mysticons require his wisdom and ancient power in putting an end to the Spectral Hand once and for all.
Hortensia Q. Sparklebottom (voiced by Catherine Disher) – The overprotective matron of the orphanage where Proxima was raised. She dotes on children and is determined to keep them safe from harm. She had deliberately planted the evidence of Proxima being Arkayna's long-lost twin sister by placing her blue-green birth gem in the vault of the dragon, to protect Zarya's true identity. She is shown to have done this many years ago, at the time when Nova Terron had come to give the younger princess twin a foz balloon for her starday. It was then that Hortensia had switched the toddler Zarya with toddler Proxima, who happened to be right next to the true royal twin at the time.
Vesper (voiced by Barbara Mamabolo) – A banshee who headed the band Vesper and the Phantoms, but backup singer Lance O'Lovely robbed her of her magical singing voice, leaving her with only her ground-shattering, ultrasonic screams and deafening subsonic screeches. She returned to reclaim her magical voice and become a celebrity singer.
Stormy – An infant storm dragon who had been found by the second generation of legendary Mysticons, in the sewers of Drake City. Due to her weather-controlling abilities, Arkayna christened her "Stormy" and vowed to keep her safe, as she was the last of her kind. When King Valmuk revealed himself, he and Stormy flew off to Dragonhenge, where he used his ancient dragon fire to reveal a hidden cavern, in which were dozens of surviving golden dragon eggs.

Animal companions

Choko – A fuzzy, white mole-like creature with pale pink ears who is Zarya's longtime friend and sidekick. He occasionally assists the Mysticons in some battles. He is quite adapt at recognizing ancient runes and mystic symbols of high magics.
Izzie – Arkayna's loyal griffin friend since childhood. She is adorned in a dark green saddle and helmet that protect her enhanced eyesight from spiked attacks.
Topaz – Emerald's faithful griffin mount. She is adorned in a purple blanket and helmet. 
Miss Paisley – Piper's griffin mount. She is adorned in a bright orange blanket. It is revealed that the name came from a stuffed griffin Piper had had as a child.
Archer – Zarya's griffin mount whom she initially named "Stinky" because of his breath. She later named him Archer; likely due to her being capable of shooting mystical lightning-like arrows from her Mysticon Ranger short-bow.
Deeva- A pale aqua fox that is the evil counterpart of Choko, who came from Proxima's Dark Codex. She has purple eyes and a strong tail that she uses to push objects away in one swish. She appears as a muffler on Mallory's neck.

Miscellaneous
Geraldine Yaga Grimm) (voiced by Lili Francks) – Is a powerful top-level Astromancer, and Malvaron and Tazma Grimm's aunt. She is an astral traveler who hops from dimension to dimension but seeks refuge in Centaur Park once a year. According to her nephew, she is a minor demigoddess who is eccentric and loves cake. She is deceived by Tazma, who claims that Zarya and Emerald had stolen her magical artifacts and spellbooks. After Geraldine is overpowered by Emerald releasing her Unicorn Bracer's mystical power, she sends Tazma away for a "time out" and cures Zarya of a life-draining spell. She then heads off for the magical kingdom of Arizona. Besides being telepathic, it is implied that she can foresee the future. She eventually is tasked with being the guardian and caretaker of Proxima, to keep her safe from Tazma and Queen Necrafa, by welcoming the long-lost Princess of Gemina to stay with her in the dimension of Earth.
Lance O'Lovely (voiced by Cory Doran)– A gnome who was once a popular singer of the boy band Gnomes to Men which played at Gawayne's coronation. He is a celebrity idolized by Emerald, Piper and Doug. According to Emerald, he sang his way from the streets to fame and fortune. However, he is revealed to be a fraud who used a magic microphone to rob former-bandmate Vesper of her talent.
Mr. Sneillson (voiced by Jamie Waston)- The male snail and librarian of the mythical Library of the Eternal Equinox. He is the powerful enforcer who enforces the rules of the library. Debuting in "Happily Never After", he is unable to help the Mysticons prevent Proxima from stealing ancient starfire ink.
The Original Mysticon Ranger- A human teenage boy who was chosen by the Dragon Disk, a millennia ago, as Mysticon Ranger. His name was never revealed but he seemed to have been a tough adversary for Dreadbane and his skeleton army until he was killed under unknown circumstances, leaving his good friend and teammate, Imani, to finish Queen Necrafa on her own at the cost of her life. To honor his heroic legacy, a stone statue of him is in the Treasury in the royal castle and in the Hill of Heroes. In The Secret of the Fifth Mysticon, his female successor, Zarya Moonwolf, had seen him fighting Orcs in a holographic image using a net-arrow technique, which she used in "Game of Phones".
The Original Mysticon Striker- A female elf who became the very first Mysticon Striker, a thousand years ago. Like her successor, Piper, she was closer to the human boy who was the original Mysticon Ranger. Her name is not revealed and she was killed under unknown circumstances. Her statue is next to those of her fellow Mysticons as a monument of her bravery until death. In The Secret of the Fifth Mysticon, Piper referred to her as the old version of her.
The Original Mysticon Knight- A male dwarf who was the predecessor of dwarven Emerald Goldenbraid. He wielded the mystical Star Sword as his weapon, as Emerald does, but it was said in The Secret of the Fifth Mysticon that he had used a broadsword. Just as with Ranger and Striker, his name and background were never revealed as there were not more than forty episodes, and had died mysteriously before Queen Necrafa's ultimate defeat and imprisonment at the hands of Imani's light golden-colored Dragon Bracer. His statue is alongside those of his fellow Mysticons in the Treasury and Hill of Heroes at the Astromancers Island.
King Goodfey – He was the first husband of Queen Goodfey and king of Gemina for many years. Nothing more about him is revealed except that he had left to defend the world from some threat and was killed at some point. Unfortunately, he did not live to know of his fraternal daughters imminent separation due to a prophecy. He is first referenced in "The Prophecy Unleashed" in a fifteen-year flashback of his wife's; that she had wished that he could see hoe doubly blessed they had been with twin daughters. According to Nova Terron, it was demise that made Queen Goodfey resolve to protect all of Gemina by any means necessary which resulted in the incomplete create of mystical sky-lances called "the Lances of Justice."
Mr. and Mrs. Moonwolf – As she was raised during her early girlhood in Mrs. Sparklebottom's fairy orphanage, Zarya is said to have been taken in by the Moonwolfs who had raised her as their own daughter for several years, in a distant village outside Drake City. At the age of 12 she was abducted and forced to become a sky-pirate by the ruthless Captain Kaos. What became of her adoptive parents is unknown, though it is implied that they had died of unknown circumstances, as Zarya admitted that she misses her parents dearly. The only memento of her mother is a gold pendent set with a forest-green gemstone. Their first names have not yet been revealed, though their last name Zarya naturally took as her own.
Alpha Galaga- The strongest of top Astromancers who was star master to a younger Nova Terron in the era of the original Mysticons who had died mysteriously and the only one who knew the full contents of the prophecy that would bring upon Gemina's imminent annihilation, which he passed on to his protege, whom he ordered to separate the fraternal Princess Twins of Gemina as the prophecy spoke of "the royal twins". At one point, he had joined with the Mysticons to create the snowy Chillwaste dimension for Adakite Flowstone.
Adakite Flowstone- An ancient female dwarf who debuted in The Secret of the Fifth Mysticon book, in which she managed to convince Emerald Goldenbraid to turn to the other Mysticons for assistance in releasing her and "restoring her" to a physical body after one thousand years of imprisonment in the Chillwaste. Long ago, she was friends with the original Mysticon Dragon Mage, Imani Firewing, even before she was chosen as leader of the Mysticons. Adakite had fought alongside Imani and her fellow Mysticons for a while and passed herself off as "Mysticon Rogue" with flaming daggers as her weapon.
Amileth- An elf who is a skilled illusionist in storing magic in special lights. She was given the title "the Amazing Amileth and her Extraordinary Illusions".

Notes

References

External links
Official website
Nickelodeon website
Characters page on Official Mysticons website
Behind the Scenes video with the Voice Actors
Mysticons page on IMDB

Mysticons characters, List of
Mysticons characters, List of
Mysticons
 
Parallel universes in fiction
 
Fictional pirates
Lists of animated science fiction television characters
Fiction about magic
Fiction about superhuman features or abilities
Fictional women soldiers and warriors
Lists of fictional females